Other Voices is a 1970 documentary film directed by David H. Sawyer. The film follows Dr. Albert Honig, one of the most controversial Doctors of his era, as he demonstrates various techniques he has employed in his treatment of comatose, catatonic, schizophrenic, and autistic patients. It follows Dr. Honig and a handful of patients living in a rural setting in Doylestown, Pennsylvania, during their daily activities, and during treatment sessions with Dr. Honig.

It was nominated for an Academy Award for Best Documentary Feature.

Cast
 Albert Honig as Doctor Albert Honig
 Sylvia Honig as Sylvia Honig
 Dan Lieberman as Dan Lieberman
 Emil Ondra as Emil Ondra
 Marnin Soltes as Marnin Soltes
 Mark Cohen as Mark Cohen

References

External links

1970 films
1970 documentary films
American documentary films
American black-and-white films
Documentary films about mental health
1970s English-language films
1970s American films